Pucca is a South Korean media franchise from the South Korean company VOOZ Character System. The main and titular character, Pucca, is the niece of three Korean men who run a Chinese-style restaurant. The restaurant, known as the "Goh-Rong", is located in Sooga Village, a small village in the mountains. Pucca is also in love with the  ninja Garu (가루 ), and Pucca always seems to beat him in combat and unintentional competition simply by sheer will. Since taking the first step in Flash animation in January 2000, it has focused on character goods business and has gained great popularity in Korea, France, Southeast Asia, and other countries. In the ‘2020 Overseas Korean Wave Survey’, it is a global character that has maintained the top spot in preference for Korean animation characters for five consecutive years.

History
Pucca was originally an "animated, online E-card service" made in 2000 by the company, VOOZ. The popularity of the E-card increased so rapidly in various Asian countries that it was licensed by Jetix Europe in 2004, who also acquired television rights for the service. VOOZ went on to continue working with Jetix Europe, making the original two and a half minute long animated shorts, which were then aired on both the Jetix website and as in-between full cartoon show shorts on the Jetix television channel. Pucca shorts were also often featured on the channel for MTV. Jetix 
Europe's director of international licensing, Richard Woolf, stated that "the possibilities with Pucca were immediately apparent, especially because you were left wanting more after watching the original shorts".

More episodes were ordered by Jetix Europe after the success of the initial shorts, with Studio B Productions in charge of making them. The new episodes became more fleshed out to depict Pucca as being a real television series, with more extensive plot being involved and some of the non-speaking characters gaining voices, along with the length of the episodes being extended to seven minutes in total. The new episodes were shown on many of Jetix's worldwide channels.

After the success of the TV show, Jetix began branching out into accessories and toys in order to bring in further revenue from the new franchise. These new products included "apparel, accessories, housewares, giftware, and stationery" focused largely on attracting younger teenagers. Since then, the age demographic has expanded to include younger children through the creation of various toy lines and older teenagers through the publishing of video games set in the Pucca universe.

Licensing
In 2008, Pucca was licensed out to the Access Licensing Group that involved a "merchandising license agreement in North America". This would allow the ALG to begin making Pucca products for sale in the US, and it was presumed that Pucca would act as a challenge to The Walt Disney Company. Ironically enough, the televised adaptation aired on Toon Disney's subsidiary network, Jetix.

Pucca was also licensed out to Warner Bros. Consumer Products in 2009. Utilizing this, WBCP started a promotional activity on Valentine's Day in France and Italy, where "flowers and Pucca press packs were sent to key journalists." A greater amount of advertising has also been started throughout the regions at various trade shows and there are currently plans to expand this to include shows in Germany and Spain.

Advertising in magazines has also become more prolific through WBCP, with a "full-page Pucca ad published in Italian Vanity Fair". Despite giving away Pucca toys through Burger King and other efforts, the market for Pucca items has been slow to advance in the UK, but has been placed under a "period of intensive consumer research that will determine the long-term marketing strategy for the brand" both there and in other markets that have been slow to accept the Pucca franchise.

Fashion
Warner Bros. Consumer Products also exhibited Pucca merchandise during the 2010 New York Fashion Week. Titled the PUCCA Capsule Collection, it was revealed at Curve Boutique on Robertson Boulevard in Los Angeles. A number of Hollywood celebrities were in attendance for the show, along with the founder of Pucca, Boo Kyoung Kim. A number of different designs from various high-profile fashion designers were exhibited at the showing for the PUCCA Capsule Collection.

A new clothing brand, titled "EXR Loves PUCCA", has started in Korea. The Wonder Girls are acting as models for the brand, which will also involve 17 other fashionistas that will be designing the clothing line. The line is a collaboration project between the Pucca franchise and the Korean clothing company EXR.

Characters

Animation

Flash animation
In the initial period, Pucca was an online animated series made with Macromedia Flash by original company VOOZ Co., Ltd. Many of its greeting cards and Flash episodes center around Pucca's comical attempts to steal a kiss from Garu and the competition at times between the two characters. There is little to no dialogue in these Flash cartoons so that fans all over the world can enjoy them. In March 2004, Jetix Europe acquired the series' television and home video rights for Europe and the Middle East.

TV series

Two animated adaptations were made for the franchise – one simply called Pucca, and the other subtitled Love Recipe. The first series featured Tabitha St. Germain as Pucca, Brian Drummond as Garu, among several other Canadian voice actors. The second series had an American dub instead – as Pucca and Garu do not speak (for a majority of the franchise), their voices remain unchanged.

DVD releases

Books

Photo Frame books

Key Chain books

German translations

There is also an ongoing manhwa series in Korea of Pucca and Garu traveling around the world through an enchanted board game. Their fellow travelers include friends Abyo, Ching, Ssoso, and villains Tobe and the Vagabond Ninja Clan. It has been translated into Chinese, Spanish, and German.

Video games
There is a WiiWare game called Pucca's Kisses Game, which is an action-platformer about Pucca trying to chase Garu around perilous levels and obstacles just to catch Garu and kiss him. This game was developed by Otaboo, and was published by BigBen Interactive. Pucca's Kisses Game was released in Europe and Australia on February 4, 2011, and in North America on February 14, 2011, for 800 Wii Points. On February 14, 2011, the game was re-released in Europe as a retail disc entitled Pucca's Race for Kisses for the Wii console.

Another game, developed for iOS, called Pucca n' Friends, was developed by Mob Crete. The game lets players play as Pucca as she prepares food and serves it to her customers, growing her restaurant as the game continues.

The game title, "Pucca Power Up", was announced by Rising Star Games was released on May 13, 2011, for the Nintendo DS. The game is being made with a partnership between the pre-mentioned game company and the franchise's creator, Vooz. It is set for a release in the UK and, likely, in Australia, but no general European release was initially announced. Later, Rising Star Games announced that the release would be for the entire PAL region, with the game arriving in the UK first. The game was released in Europe on May 13, 2011, and in North America on September 13, 2011.

References

External links
 
 Vooz Co., Ltd. The animation company behind Pucca Funny Love and other Korean flash cartoons.  Has English, Korean, Chinese and Japanese menus.
 Official website at the Wayback Machine (archived April 8, 2006)
 Pucca on tv.com
 Pucca's Official Fanpage on Facebook

Child superheroes
Jetix original programming
South Korean animation
Fictional characters with superhuman strength
Fictional mute characters
Manhwa titles
Ninja fiction
Ninja parody
Animated web series
Japan in non-Japanese culture